The 1960 Open Championship was held at the Royal Automobile Club in Pall Mall, London from 2–7 December 1959.The Open championship was moved to December to avoid a clash with the professional championship. However to confuse matters instead of waiting until December 1960 the authorities decided to hold the tournament in December 1959 despite the fact that it had already been held in March 1959.
Azam Khan retained his title beating Roshan Khan in final. Roshan slipped in the second rally of the final hurting himself, he played well until 4-1 behind in the first game but then faded very badly and could not move fluently which led to Azam going through the motions of wrapping up the easy victory.

Seeds

Draw and results

Section 1

Section 2

+ amateur
^ seeded

Semi-finals & Final

References

Men's British Open Squash Championships
Men's British Open Championship
Men's British Open Squash Championship
Men's British Open Squash Championship
Men's British Open Squash Championship
Squash competitions in London